Brassaiopsis glomerulata is a species of shrub in the family Araliaceae. Extracts are sold as bodybuilding supplements based on the assumption that aromatase inhibitors present in the plant might have effects in humans.

References

glomerulata
Bodybuilding supplements
Flora of India (region)
Flora of Bhutan
Flora of Nepal
Flora of Indo-China
Flora of Malesia